Lynn Joyce Roethke (born June 22, 1961) is an American female judoka competitor.  Among her most notable accomplishments, Lynn is a two-time Olympic athlete, a Pan American gold medalist, and World Champion Silver medalist.   She was the first female to be inducted to the Black Belt Hall of Fame and voted as Olympic Athlete of the Year. She competed in the −61 kg division for most of her competitive career (early 1980s – late 1990s).

Olympics 

Roethke is a two-time US Olympic competitor for judo. Lynn competed in the 1988 Summer Olympic Games in Seoul, Korea where she would win the silver medal in the -61 kg (134 lbs) division.  This would make her the first American woman to compete in the finals (the gold was won by Diane Bell of GBR).  During these Olympics, women's judo was a demonstration sport, therefore did not count towards the USA's total medal count. Lynn was also a member of the Olympic team at the 1992 Summer Olympics in Barcelona, Spain.  Lynn is also a Pan American Games Champion in Sambo.

World Championships
Ms. Roethke won the silver medal in the 1987 World Judo Championships in Essen, West Germany.   She was defeated by Diane Bell of GBR in the −61 kg division.

Pan American Games
Roethke won the gold medal in the 1987 Pan American Games in Indianapolis. She defeated Natasha Hernandez in the −61 kg division.
Ms. Roethke won the silver medal in the 1991 Pan American Games in Havana, Cuba. She was defeated by Illeana Beltran in the −61 kg division.

US National Championships
Roethke won the gold medal during 9 US National Championships.
 1984 Orlando, FL – defeated Kathy Dalton 
 1985 Farmington Hills, MI – defeated Kathy Dalton 
 1986 Honolulu, HI – defeated Tammy Otaka 
 1987 Pittsburgh, PA – defeated Kathy Dalton 
 1989 Tampa, FL – defeated Liliko Ogasawara
 1990 San Diego, CA – defeated Brenda Day 
 1991 Honolulu, HI – defeated Brenda Day 
 1993 Indianapolis, IN – defeated Idiko Szasz 
 1994 Irvine, CA – defeated Hannelore Brown  in the −56 kg division

Bronze Medal
 1983 Los Angeles, CA – defeated by Robin Chapman (Judo) for gold, Cindy Sovljanski for silver.
 1995 Indianapolis, IN – defeated by Corrina Broz for gold, Marissa Pedulla for silver   in the −56 kg division
 2004 Villa Park, IL – defeated by Valerie Gotay for gold, Colleen McDonald for silver  in the −56 kg division

Present
Lynn currently owns and operates Club Olympia in Fond du Lac, Wisconsin, where she is a certified trainer and runs her own dojo, Club Olympia Judo.  She is an eighth degree black belt.

References

1961 births
Living people
American female judoka
Judoka at the 1988 Summer Olympics
Judoka at the 1992 Summer Olympics
Olympic judoka of the United States
Pan American Games gold medalists for the United States
Pan American Games silver medalists for the United States
Pan American Games medalists in judo
Sambokas at the 1983 Pan American Games
Judoka at the 1987 Pan American Games
Judoka at the 1991 Pan American Games
Medalists at the 1987 Pan American Games
Medalists at the 1991 Pan American Games
20th-century American women